Claypole was a rural district in Lincolnshire, Parts of Kesteven from 1894 to 1931.  It was formed under the Local Government Act 1894 from that part of the Newark-on-Trent rural sanitary district which was in Kesteven (the rest going to form the Newark Rural District in Nottinghamshire).

It was abolished in 1931 under a County Review Order, being split between the new rural districts of North Kesteven and West Kesteven.

References
https://web.archive.org/web/20070930210951/http://www.visionofbritain.org.uk/relationships.jsp?u_id=10042756

Rural districts of Kesteven
Districts of England created by the Local Government Act 1894